Yvonne Meusburger was the defending champion, but lost to Chanelle Scheepers in the second round.

Andrea Petkovic won the title, defeating qualifier Shelby Rogers in the final, 6–3, 6–3.

Seeds

Draw

Finals

Top half

Bottom half

Qualifying

Seeds

Qualifiers

Lucky losers
  Beatriz García Vidagany

Draw

First qualifier

Second qualifier

Third qualifier

Fourth qualifier

Fifth qualifier

Sixth qualifier

References
 Main draw
 Qualifying draw

Gastein Ladies - Singles
2014 Singles
Gast
Gast